Juxtaposition is an act or instance of placing two elements close together or side by side. This is often done in order to compare/contrast the two, to show similarities or differences, etc.

Speech
Juxtaposition in literary terms is the showing contrast by concepts placed side by side. An example of juxtaposition are the quotes "Ask not what your country can do for you; ask what you can do for your country", and "Let us never negotiate out of fear, but let us never fear to negotiate", both by John F. Kennedy, who particularly liked juxtaposition as a rhetorical device. Jean Piaget specifically contrasts juxtaposition in various fields from syncretism, arguing that "juxtaposition and syncretism are in antithesis, syncretism being the predominance of the whole over the details, juxtaposition that of the details over the whole". Piaget writes:

In grammar, juxtaposition refers to the absence of linking elements in a group of words that are listed together. Thus, where English uses the conjunction and (e.g. mother and father), many languages use simple juxtaposition ("mother father"). In logic, juxtaposition is a logical fallacy on the part of the observer, where two items placed next to each other imply a correlation, when none is actually claimed. For example, an illustration of a politician and Adolf Hitler on the same page would imply that the politician had a common ideology with Hitler.  Similarly, saying "Hitler was in favor of gun control, and so are you" would have the same effect. This particular rhetorical device is common enough to have its own name, Reductio ad Hitlerum.

Mathematics
This implicit usage of multiplication can cause ambiguity when the concatenated variables happen to match the name of another variable, when a variable name in front of a parenthesis can be confused with a function name, or in the correct determination of the order of operations.

It is also used for scalar multiplication, matrix multiplication, function composition, and logical and. In numeral systems, juxtaposition of digits has a specific meaning. In geometry, juxtaposition of names of points represents lines or line segments. In lambda calculus, juxtaposition  denotes function application.

Arts

Throughout the arts, juxtaposition of elements is used to elicit a response within the audience's mind, such as creating meaning from the contrast. In music, it is an abrupt change of elements, and is a procedure of musical contrast. In film, the position of shots next to one another (montage) is intended to have this effect. In painting and photography, the juxtaposition of colours, shapes, etc, is used to create contrast, while the position of particular kinds of objects one upon the other or different kinds of characters in proximity to one another is intended to evoke meaning. Various forms of juxtaposition occur in literature, where two images that are otherwise not commonly brought together appear side by side or structurally close together, thereby forcing the reader to stop and reconsider the meaning of the text through the contrasting images, ideas, motifs, etc. For example, "He was slouched gracefully" is a juxtaposition. More broadly, an author can juxtapose contrasting types of characters, such as a hero and a rogue working together to achieve a common objective from very different motivations.

See also
Juxtaposed controls

References

External links

Rhetorical techniques